The  Washington Redskins season was the franchise's 13th season in the National Football League (NFL) and their 7th in Washington, D.C. The team matched on their 6–3–1 record from 1943, when they made it to the Championship game but missed the playoffs.

Schedule

Standings

References

Washington
Washington Redskins seasons
Washington